Daga may refer to:

People
 Daga (wrestler), Mexican professional wrestler
Dagmara Wozniak, American Olympic saber fencer

Geography
 Daga District, Bhutan
 Daga, Bhutan, capital of Daba District
 Daga Hundred, a geographic division in Sweden
 Daga Island, an island located in the southeastern part of Lake Tana in Ethiopia
 Daga River (disambiguation)
 Daga Rural LLG, Papua New Guinea

Other
 Daga language, in Papua New Guinea